The Ferrocarril y Terminal del Valle de México (Ferrovalle) is a company that operates railroads and terminals in and around Mexico City, the capital of Mexico. It is jointly owned by Kansas City Southern de Mexico, Ferromex and Ferrosur.

Locomotives

As of today the FTVM has different locomotives from EMD and GE
 9 EMD SW1504s
 9 GE B23-7s
 3 EMD GP38-2s (These are FTVMs newest locomotives)
 6 EMD MP15ACs
 5 GE C30-7s

See also 
List of Mexican railroads

References

External links 
Ferrovalle official site (in Spanish)

Valle de Mexico
Railway companies established in 1998
Standard gauge railways in Mexico